The 2020 edition of the European Men's and Women's Team Badminton Championships was held in Liévin, France, from 11 to 16 February 2020. This tournament also serves as European qualification for the 2020 Thomas & Uber Cup.

Medalists

Tournament
The 2020 European Men's and Women's Team Badminton Championships officially crowned the best male and female national teams in Europe and at the same time worked as the European qualification event towards the 2020 Thomas & Uber Cup finals. 63 teams consisting of 34 men's team and 29 women's team entered the tournament.

Venue
This tournament was held at Arena Stade Couvert in Liévin, France.

Seeds
The defending Champions, Denmark, were top seeded for both men's and women's team, while the host country France were seeded third.

 Men's team

 
 
 
 
 
 
 
 

 Women's team

Draw
The draw was held on 3 December 2019. The men's team group stage consisted of six groups with four teams in each and two groups with five teams in each. The women's team group stage consisted of six groups with four teams in each and one group with five teams.

 Men's team

 Women's team

Men's team

Format
In each group, teams played each other once. The eight group winners qualified for the knockout stage.

Squads

Groups

Group 1

Group 2

Group 3

Group 4

Group 5

Group 6

Group 7

Group 8

Knockout stage

Women's team

Format
In each group, teams played each other once. The seven group winners and the one best runners-up qualified for the knockout stage.

Squads

Groups

Group 1

Group 2

Group 3

Group 4

Group 5

Group 6

Group 7

Ranking of second-placed teams

Knockout stage

References

External links
 European Men's & Women's Team Championships
 Official website

 
European Men's and Women's Team Badminton Championships
European Men's and Women's Team Badminton Championships
Badminton tournaments in France
European Men's and Women's Team Badminton Championships
Sport in Pas-de-Calais
European Men's and Women's Team Badminton Championships